Neopseustis moxiensis is a species of moth belonging to the family Neopseustidae. It was described by Liusheng Chen, Mamoru Owada, Min Wang, and Yang Long in 2009. It is known from the Sichuan Province in China.

The wingspan is 19–20 mm.

Etymology
The species is named for the locality: Moxi Town, Luding County in the Sichuan Province in China.

References

Neopseustidae